or CPE Lyon is a French  located in Villeurbanne, near Lyon.

Degrees
CPE Lyon offers two diplôme d'ingénieur and two Master's level degrees, in two disciplines and three diplomas.

The chemistry and chemical engineering degrees involve the conception, synthesis and manufacture of new  and valuable molecules that can be "first on the market". They also involve a focus on environmental issues, sustainability and management.

The electronics, telecommunications, maths and computer science degrees include a global education in electronics, microelectronics, computer science, image and signal processing, telecommunications, applied math and management.

CPE Lyon also conducts research in organic chemistry, analytical sciences, chemical and process engineering, microelectronics and image processing.

Selected students can prepare a PhD in one of the research laboratories (50 new students per year on average).

History
In 1883, the École Supérieure de Chimie Industrielle de Lyon (ESCIL) was founded by Jules Raulin, a student of Louis Pasteur. In 1919 1912 Nobel Prize in Chemistry winner Victor Grignard became a director. In that same year, the Institut de Chimie et Physique Industrielles de Lyon (ICPI) was founded by Professor Lepercq. In 1933, the École Supérieure de Chimie Industrielle de Lyon (ESCIL) was awarded the Légion d'Honneur by the Ministry of War, for service to the nation.

In 1993, Hubert Curien, former chairman of the European Space Agency (ESA), former president of the CERN and former minister was appointed President of ESCIL. One year later, in 1994, the École Supérieure de Chimie Industrielle de Lyon (ESCIL) and the Institut de Chimie et Physique Industrielles de Lyon (ICPI) merged to form the current École Supérieure de Chimie Physique Électronique de Lyon (CPE-Lyon).

In 2005, Jean Dercourt, Secretary of the French Academy of Sciences, was appointed President of the École Supérieure de Chimie Physique Électronique de Lyon (CPE-Lyon).

Notable alumni
Notable alumni of the École Supérieure de Chimie Physique Électronique de Lyon include, among many others:

Notable scientists
Yves Chauvin (ESCIL 1954) : 2005 Nobel Prize in Chemistry
Jean-Marie Basset (ESCIL 1965): Member of the French Academy of Sciences (Académie des sciences), received in 1991 the award from Max Planck Society
Emile Kuntz (ESCIL 1965): awarded in 2005 with the Chéreau Lavet Prize - Prize of the French Academy of Technologies
Jean Fréchet (ICPI-C 1966): Henry Rapoport Chair of Organic Chemistry at the Department of Chemistry, University of California, Berkeley
Jean Jouzel (ESCIL 1968): glaciologist and climatologist

CEOs and industrialists
Laurent de la Clergerie (ICPI-E 1994): Founder and Chairman of the Management Board of LDLC.com
Bruno Bonnell (ESCIL 1981): Founder of Infogrames Entertainment, SA, Chairman of the Board, Acting Chief Financial Officer, Chief Creative Officer of Atari, Inc. and deputy La république en marche in the French parlement.
Marcel Mérieux (ESCIL 1891): Student of Louis Pasteur and founder of Institut Mérieux that became Sanofi Aventis. Institut Mérieux is a parent company of bioMérieux.
Aiman Ezzat: CEO of Capgemini

Others
Marcelle Lafont (1930) - chemical engineer, Resistance heroine and politician.
Jean-Christophe Rolland (ICPI-E 1991): Rowing Gold medal at the 2000 Sydney Olympic Games

Facts & Figures
75% of the students spend at least one year abroad
75 Companies (average) attend the yearly CPE Lyon Student Recruiting Event (Journée Entreprise)
11 Research Laboratories in cooperation with the CNRS, Université Claude Bernard Lyon 1
24 000 m2 dedicated to the Education, R&D
500 publications per year
50 PhD graduations per year
30 patents per year
3,37M€ revenues from contracts with the Industry in 2005

International Exchanges
For many years CPE Lyon has partnered with 90 universities abroad including:
Queen's University
École Polytechnique de Montréal
Université de Montréal
McGill University
University of Toronto
McMaster University
University of Waterloo
Université de Sherbrooke
University of British Columbia
Yuan Ze University
Tianjin University of Technology
École Polytechnique Fédérale de Lausanne
Eidgenössische Technische Hochschule
Colombie Universidad Industrial de Santander
Georgia Institute of Technology
Universität Würzburg
Technische Universität Hamburg
Universität Stuttgart
Universität Ulm
Friedrich-Schiller-Universität
Technische Universität München
Universität Karlsruhe
Universidad Politecnica de Madrid
Universidad de Salamanca
Heriot-Watt University
University College London
University of Birmingham
University of Durham
University of Hull
University of Newcastle
University of Nottingham
Technische Universiteit Eindhoven
Norwegian University of Science and Technology
Royal Institute of Technology or Kungliga Tekniska högskolan (KTH)
North Carolina State University
Oregon State University
Purdue University
Tufts University
University of California Berkeley
University of Illinois Urbana-Champaign
University of Illinois at Chicago
University of North Carolina at Chapel Hill
University of Notre Dame
University of Pittsburgh
Texas A&M University

Notes and references

External links
 École supérieure de chimie physique électronique de Lyon
 Website of the students of CPE Lyon

Educational institutions established in 1883
Engineering universities and colleges in France
Lyon
Universities and colleges in Lyon
1883 establishments in France